Breast examination, also known as clinical breast examination, is a physical examination performed by a medical professional on an individual presenting with signs and symptoms in a breast, periodically on some people with a family history of breast disease, or on a person with an incidental abnormal finding on imaging such as mammography.  

Techniques may vary from one medical professional to another, but essentially follow the principles of obtaining informed consent, inspecting and then palpating the breasts, followed by looking for nearby lymph nodes. A chaperone is offered prior to beginning the examination. The method is similar in both males and females. 

Examination findings are generally reported using particular terms; size, symmetry, texture, description of any lump and appearance of skin. Some organisations recommend a breast examination as part of routine screening, typically in some high risk groups.

See also
Breast self-examination

References

Physical examination
Breast cancer awareness